Tony King (born 11 September 1955) is a former Australian rules footballer who played with Hawthorn and St Kilda in the Victorian Football League (VFL). King had an active career as a sporting administrator after his playing days concluded. He was the executive director of the National Basketball League for four years, before serving as general manager of the Melbourne Football Club from 1986 to 1992.

Notes

External links 		
		
		
		
		
		
		
Living people		
1955 births		
Australian rules footballers from Victoria (Australia)		
Hawthorn Football Club players		
St Kilda Football Club players
University Blacks Football Club players
Melbourne Football Club CEOs